The 1998 Arizona gubernatorial election took place on November 3, 1998, for the post of Governor of Arizona. Jane Dee Hull, the incumbent Republican Governor of Arizona, defeated the Democratic nominee and Mayor of Phoenix, Paul Johnson. Hull became the first woman to win a gubernatorial election in Arizona, although not the first woman to serve as governor of Arizona, (a distinction held by Democrat Rose Mofford, who ascended to the position in 1988 upon Republican Evan Mecham's impeachment and removal from office, and who served until 1990, declining to run for a full term).

Democratic primary

Candidates
 Paul Johnson, Mayor of Phoenix

Results

Republican primary

Candidates
 Charles Brown
 Jim Howl
 Jane Dee Hull, incumbent Governor of Arizona

Results

Libertarian primary

Candidates
 Katherine Gallant
 Tom Rawles, Maricopa County Supervisor

Results

Reform primary

Candidates
 Scott Alan Malcomson

Results

General election

Results

See also
 Smart Voter Biography of Paul Johnson
 Biography of Jane Dee Hull

References

1998
1998 United States gubernatorial elections
Gubernatorial